Joe Cullen may refer to:

 Joe Cullen (American football) (born 1967), defensive line coach
 Joe Cullen (darts player) (born 1989), English darts player

See also
Joseph Cullen (disambiguation)